Canton of Nevers may refer to:

 Canton of Nevers-1, Nièvre, Bourgogne-Franche-Comté, France
 Canton of Nevers-2, Nièvre, Bourgogne-Franche-Comté, France
 Canton of Nevers-3, Nièvre, Bourgogne-Franche-Comté, France
 Canton of Nevers-4, Nièvre, Bourgogne-Franche-Comté, France

See also

 Arrondissement of Nevers, Nièvre, Bourgogne-Franche-Comté, France
 Prefecture of Nevers, Nièvre, Bourgogne-Franche-Comté, France
 County of Nevers, Burgundy
 Duchy of Nevers, France
 Nevers (disambiguation)